The mesosalpinx is part of the lining of the abdominal cavity in higher vertebrates, specifically the portion of the broad ligament that stretches from the ovary to the level of the fallopian tube.

See also
 Mesometrium
 Mesovarium
 Salpinx in anatomy

References

External links
 

Mammal female reproductive system